Tiruttani is a town in Tiruvallur district, suburb of Chennai within Chennai Metropolitan Area limit in state of Tamil Nadu, India. This town is famous for Tiruttani Murugan Temple which is one of the Arupadaiveedu and is dedicated to (Kartikeya) Murugan.In October 2022 Tiruttani is a part of Chennai Metropolitan Area.

History
The name Tiruttani is of Tamil origin. During the formation of Andhra state on 1 November 1953, Tiruttani was part of Chittoor district of Andhra Pradesh state and continued to be there until 1960. On 1 April 1960, with the Andhra Pradesh and Madras Alteration of Boundaries Act of 1959, Tiruttani, Pothatturpettai, Pallipattu and Ramakrishnarajapettai assembly areas of Andhra Pradesh are transferred to Madras state (now Tamil Nadu) in exchange for smaller area on linguistic basis.

Geography

Climate

Demographics

According to the 2011 census, Tiruttani had a population of 64,781 with a sex ratio of 1,003 females for every 1,000 males, well above the national average of 929. A total of 4,656 were under the age of six, constituting 2,441 males and 2,215 females. Scheduled Castes and Scheduled Tribes accounted for 12.42% and 2.4% of the population respectively. The average literacy of the town was 75.32%, compared to the national average of 72.99%. The town had a total of 11,122 households. There were a total of 16,451 workers, comprising 462 cultivators, 715 main agricultural labourers, 550 in household industries, 12,648 other workers, 2,076 marginal workers, 44 marginal cultivators, 180 marginal agricultural labourers, 202 marginal workers in household industries and 1,650 other marginal workers. As per the religious census of 2011, Tiruttani had 91.85% Hindus, 6.35% Muslims, 1.61% Christians, 0.02% Sikhs, 0.04% Buddhists, 0.06% Jains, 0.06% following other religions and 0.% following no religion or did not indicate any religious preference.

Politics

The Andhra Pradesh and Madras Alteration of Boundaries Act, enacted in 1959 by the Parliament of India under the provisions of article 3 of the constitution, went into effect from 1 April 1960. Under the act, Tiruttani taluk and Pallipattu sub-taluk of the Chittoor district of Andhra Pradesh were transferred to Madras State in exchange for territories from the Chingelput (Chengalpattu) and Salem Districts.

Tiruttani's assembly constituency is in Arakkonam (Lok Sabha constituency). It was part of Sriperumbudur (Lok Sabha constituency) earlier.

Transport
Tiruttani has transport links to the nearest cities, towns and villages. Its bus depot contains a total of 79 buses, including 42 operating in rural areas. During the festival season, additional buses are operated in order to keep up with the increased demand. The state of Tamil Nadu operates frequent buses to locations including Chennai, Tirupati, Salem, Bangalore, Tiruvallur, Vellore, Arakkonam, Chittoor, Chengalpet, Kanchipuram, Tiruvannamalai, Pothatturpettai, Tiruvelpur and Pallipattu Southern Railway also operates frequent passenger services to and from Chennai.Many electric trains are operated and some express trains which pass through this station stops here. The first local train from Chennai Central is 3:50 am and last train is at 8:20 pm.

Notable people
It is also the birthplace of the 2nd President and 1st Vice President of India, Dr. Sarvepalli Radhakrishnan who was born here on 5 September 1888 and his birthday is celebrated as Teacher's Day all over India.

Educational Institutions

Schools 
 Dr.V.Genguswamy Naidu Matriculation school
 Thalapathy K.Vinayagam School
 Sudhandira Matriculation School
 Dr.K.Radha Krsihnan Govt Boys Hr.Sec School
 GRT Mahalakshmi Vidyalaya CBSE School
 Ruby Matriculation School
 New Eden School
 MGR Nagar School
 Panchayat Union Primary School
 Govt Girls Hr.Sec.School
 St.Marys Matriculation School
 Shaktthi public school
 KIDZOM International Play School
 Maha Bodhi Vidyalaya English medium school
 TRS Global Public school
 TRS IKEN Ë-Brain Kids
 Sudandira matriculation school

Colleges 

 Arulmigu Sri Subbiramani Swamy Arts and Science college
 GRT College of nursing
 GRT Institute of engineering and technology
 Tamil Nadu paramedical training institute
 GRT College of educations
 Tiruttani Polytechnic college
 Saravana ITI

See also
Santhanagopalapuram
Kaivandur
Pazhani, satellite murugan temple located in Dindugul district, Tamil Nadu.

References

External links

Cities and towns in Tiruvallur district